Julian Nicco-Annan (born 25 October 1985), better known by his stage name Juls, is a British-Ghanaian record producer, disc jockey, and musician. He is considered one of the pioneering producers of African music in the diaspora, particularly in Afrobeats circles. He is best known for the production of songs like Bankulize and "Skin Tight" by Mr Eazi which accrued over two million views on YouTube; "Feel Alright" by Show Dem Camp, Rudebwoi Love by Stonebwoy and Gwarn by Burna Boy. He has collaborated with labels like BBnz Live, Toko Beatz, Stereofly Records, Cosmic Harmony, and Lost Ones and worked on A&R for Mr.Eazi's Life is Eazi album.

Early life 
Juls was born in Hackney, East London, to musically inclined parents who moved from Ghana to Britain in the late 1970s. He moved to Hackney, and then to Stevenage in Hertfordshire. He had his education in London, eventually acquiring a bachelor's degree and master's degree in Finance from the University of Surrey in England, and developed his music talent there.

Career 
In early 2010, Juls began to produce music casually. His first break occurred once he produced a song for Show Dem Camp entitled "Feel Alright" in 2012, and he began to DJ while finishing his studies in Surrey in 2013. Once his work gained significant traction, he began to release his own music,  including "Teef Teef," "With You," and "Give You Love,". His debut album entitled Leap of Faith followed in 2017 with Ojekoo, which featured Kojey Radical ("Temperature Rising"), Maleek Berry and Nonso Amadi ("Early"), and Eugy, Not3s, and Kojo Funds ("Bad"). These albums both gained over 30 million streams on all major streaming platforms that year.

Bankulize and Mr Eazi 
In 2013, Mr Eazi began to promote shows in Kumasi, Ghana, and sent the vocals for one of his songs “Bankulize” to Juls in London  after meeting him on Twitter. The collaborative track would eventually create Mr Eazi's largest fanbase in the diaspora and become a cult hit.  The song features vocals from Ghanaian hiplife artist Pappy Kojo and was released in November 2014. The official remix of "Bankulize" features Burna Boy and was released in September 2016. Mr Eazi premiered the remix on Ebro Darden's Beats 1 radio show a month earlier.

Colour 

He then produce Wande Coal's "So Mi So", along with "Maayaa," featuring Cruel Santino (aka Santi) and Tiggs Da Author in 2019. The track was inspired by Maya Angelou and the women who raised him. Following this, he'd release the Colour project, which featured the likes of Sweetie Irie and Sway Clarke. The album was so named due to the mix of skills and genres featured.

“I don’t think there is anything wrong with our content. Look at all the quality videos that our artistes are putting out. Boasting our culture and our identity. The western media isn’t used to this new narrative. As our music scene gets bigger, it’s getting harder to ignore because African Pop music is what is hot right now. Look around you. Our influence is all over everything from film, to music to fashion. Also, I don’t think our aim or my aim anyways is to rub shoulders with “foreign counterparts”. It’s about spreading the culture and our music and getting heard. We haven’t had those resources and access to major funding that’s the only issue. And most African artistes are now getting educated on the business side of things so we don’t get cheated. It takes time. Illiteracy has been Africa’s major problem for developing as a continent. First solution is to take pride in our culture and educate ourselves first.”Juls in an interview with BlanckDigital

Happy Place 
In February 2020, Juls traveled to South Africa to experience the culture of Amapiano first hand (a style of house music that emerged in South Africa in mid 2010s), and began to explore producing the style of music. He then released the 5-track EP Happy Place which features artists from South Africa, Nigeria, Jamaica and Ghana including singer-songwriter Busiswa and vocalist King Promise.

Since the release of Happy Place, Juls has released a 2-track collaboration with Sango entitled Fufu & Grits with Soulection, and another new single featuring Randy Valentine titled “Wata”.

"U Say" 
Juls produced "U Say" on the second studio album of American rapper Goldlink, entitled Diaspora. He later flew to LA to be appear in the video for the single which featured Tyler, the Creator and Jay Prince, and was directed by Cruel Santino.

Tours 
Juls performed at SXSW in both 2017 and 2018, Encore Festival, The Ends Festival and TIDAL x Diaspora Calling with Lauryn Hill., Ibiza Meltdown 2019 and Afro Republik/Wizkid. He was invited and spoke at ADE-Amsterdam Dance Event in 2019, and hosts his self-curated tour entitled A Night With Juls which features live sets and DJs, the first of which was held in New York on the 23rd of August 2019.

Discography 

EPs

 Solora (2014)
 Berlin (2014)
 MS (2014)
 Ojekoo (2017)
 Happy Place (2020)

Albums
 Aamake Sange Nao (2014)
 Finest Club Hits,Vol.8 (2015)
 Finest Club Hits, Vol.9
 Leap of Faith (2017)
 Colour (2019)
 Sounds of My World (2021)

Singles

Achievements 
Juls won Producer of the Year at the Ghana Music Awards UK and AFRIMA Awards in 2017. He also was nominated for Best African Act at the Music of Black Origin Awards that year.

References 

British people of Ghanaian descent
Living people
British record producers
British DJs
People from Hackney, London
1985 births
Alumni of the University of Surrey